Abdul Rahman Khleifawi (1930 – 15 March 2009) was a Syrian military officer and politician. He was Prime Minister of Syria from 1971 succeeding Hafez al-Assad who just promoted to the post of President of Syria to 1972 for 1 year and again from 1976 to 1978 for about 2 years, he served as Prime Minister for two separate terms together under President Hafez al-Assad.

Early life
Khleifawi was born in 1930. He was of Algerian descent, originally from Draâ Ben Khedda.

Career
Khleifawi was an army general. He served twice as prime minister of Syria. He was firstly in office from 3 April 1971 to 21 December 1972, being the first prime minister under the presidency of Hafez al-Assad. Khleifawi served as prime minister again from 7 August 1976 to 27 March 1978. He also served as a minister of interior between 1970 and 1971 under President Ahmad al-Khatib and Prime Minister Hafez al-Assad.

References

1930 births
2009 deaths
Prime Ministers of Syria
Members of the Regional Command of the Arab Socialist Ba'ath Party – Syria Region
Syrian ministers of interior
Place of birth missing
Syrian people of Algerian descent